Guerry Romondt (born 10 August 1985, Port-de-Paix, Haiti) is a Haitian footballer who currently plays for Arcahaie.

Youth career
Romondt left his hometown of Port-de-paix in 1999 to go to Port-au-Prince to train with a small club named Sophisa FC.

Club career
Romondt started his career with Racing Club Haïtien in 2003. In 2005, he left to play in the second division of Haitian football for the AS Saint-Louis du Nord (ASSL). A year removed and he left to play for Zénith. After a year at Zénith, Romondt went back to ASSL. In 2011, he signed to play with Tempête where he won the Ligue Haïtienne that year. In 2015, Romondt left Tempête for FICA and has won two back-to-back championships between 2015–2016.

International career
Romondt made his international debut for the Haiti national football team against Bolivia on 6 February 2013.

References

External links

1985 births
Living people
Haitian footballers
Haiti international footballers
People from Port-de-Paix
Association football goalkeepers
Ligue Haïtienne players